Cristian San Francisco Ngua Ebea Metehe (born 2 February 2001), known as Cristian Ebea and sometimes as Cris Ebea, is an Equatorial Guinean footballer who plays as a right back for Spanish Tercera Federación club Sporting B and the Equatorial Guinea national team.

Early life
Ebea was born in Madrid, Spain to Equatoguinean Fang parents, but moved to Equatorial Guinea shortly after. He attended the E'Waiso Ipola enfants college in Malabo. He went to Valencia at 6 and back to Madrid at 8. After that, his older brother enrolled him in CP Parla Escuela.

Club career
Ebea is a CP Parla Escuela, CD Móstoles URJC, CF Trival Valderas, Academia InterSoccer Madrid and Getafe CF product. He has played for UP Langreo and EI San Martín in Spain.

International career
Ebea made his senior debut for Equatorial Guinea on 29 March 2022, as a 74-minute substitute in a 0–0 friendly draw against Angola.

Career statistics

International

References

External links

2001 births
Living people
Citizens of Equatorial Guinea through descent
Equatoguinean footballers
Association football fullbacks
Association football wingers
Equatorial Guinea international footballers
Fang people
Footballers from Madrid
Spanish footballers
CF Trival Valderas players
Getafe CF footballers
UP Langreo footballers
Divisiones Regionales de Fútbol players
Segunda División B players
Tercera División players
Tercera Federación players
Segunda Federación players
Spanish sportspeople of Equatoguinean descent